The Augusta Symphony Orchestra, established shortly after World War I, is a nonprofit symphony orchestra in Augusta, Maine.  It consists of fifty volunteer amateur and semi-professional musicians and is conducted by Jinwook Park.  The orchestra's season includes concerts in spring and fall.

External links
Official site

American orchestras
Musical groups from Maine
Musical groups established in 1919
Performing arts in Maine